The 1930 Major League Baseball season was contested from April 14 to October 8, 1930. The St. Louis Cardinals and Philadelphia Athletics were the regular season champions of the National League and American League, respectively. The Athletics then defeated the Cardinals in the World Series, four games to two.

Offense dominated this season. The National League batted .303, with six teams batting better than .300. The American League came in at .288, with three teams batting over .300.

Standings

American League

National League

Postseason

Bracket

MLB statistical leaders

Managers

American League

National League

Home Field Attendance

Events
On consecutive days in July 1930, the Philadelphia Phillies manages to score 15 runs in a game, but were losers in both games. On July 23, the Phillies lost to the Pittsburgh Pirates 16–15, and on July 24, they lost to the Chicago Cubs 19–15. The July 24 game still holds the record for the most runs scored in a game without a home run.

References

External links
1930 Major League Baseball season schedule at Baseball Reference

 
Major League Baseball seasons